Thomas Parke Hughes (September 13, 1923 – February 3, 2014) was an American historian of technology. He was an emeritus professor of history at the University of Pennsylvania and a visiting professor at MIT and Stanford.

He received his Ph.D. from the University of Virginia in 1953.

Hughes, along with John B. Rae, Carl W. Condit, and Melvin Kranzberg, were responsible for the establishment of the Society for the History of Technology and he was a recipient of its highest honor, the Leonardo da Vinci Medal in 1985.

He contributed to the concepts of technological momentum, technological determinism, large technical systems, social construction of technology, and introduced systems theory into the history of technology.

His book American Genesis was shortlisted for the Pulitzer Prize. He was elected to the American Philosophical Society in 2003.

Main works
 Networks of Power: Electrification in Western Society, 1880-1930.  Baltimore: Johns Hopkins University Press, 1983. .
 Edited with Wiebe E. Bijker and Trevor J. Pinch, eds.  The Social Construction of Technological Systems: New Directions in the Sociology and History of Technology.  Cambridge, MA: M.I.T. Press, 1987.
 Edited with Renate Mayntz.  The Development of Large Technical Systems.  Frankfurt am Main: Boulder, CO: Campus Verlag; Westview Press, 1988.
 American Genesis: A Century of Invention and Technological Enthusiasm, 1870-1970.  New York, NY: Viking, 1989. Which was also a Pulitzer Prize finalist.
 Edited with Agatha C. Hughes.  Lewis Mumford: Public Intellectual.  New York: 1990.
Rescuing Prometheus.  1st ed.  New York: Pantheon Books, 1998.
 Human-Built World: How to Think About Technology and Culture.  Chicago, IL: University of Chicago Press, 2004.

References

External links
 Joel Moses, "Thomas P. Hughes, 1923–2014," National Academies Memorial Tributes: Volume 20 (2016) 
 University of Pennsylvania Faculty Page
 Economic Principals
 G. Pascal Zachary, "Remembering Thomas P. Hughes," in New Atlantis 42 (Spring 2014): 103–108
 Oral history interview with Thomas P. Hughes Charles Babbage Institute 1980
  Arthur Molella, "Hughes on Technology," Minerva 43 no. 1 (March 2005): 113-117 
 W. Bernard Carlson, "From Order to Messy Complexity: Thoughts on the Intellectual Journey of Thomas Parke Hughes," Technology and Culture 55 no. 4, October (2014): 945-952. DOI:10.1353/tech.2014.0108
 Thomas Parke Hughes papers (Accession 2259), Hagley Museum and Library, Wilmington, DE
 For a critical application of Thomas Hughes, see: Shamir, Ronen (2013). Current Flow: The Electrification of Palestine. Stanford: Stanford University Press. http://www.sup.org/book.cgi?id=22869

American historians of science
Historians of technology
University of Pennsylvania faculty
University of Virginia alumni
1923 births
2014 deaths
Members of the Royal Swedish Academy of Engineering Sciences
Members of the United States National Academy of Engineering
Leonardo da Vinci Medal recipients
Members of the American Philosophical Society